Pyramimonadaceae is a family of green algae.

Genera 
The following genera are considered valid:

 Angulomonas
 Coccopterum
 Cymbomonas
 Kuzminia
 Pocillomonas
 Prasinochloris
 Protoaceromonas
 Protochroomonas
 Pyramimonas
 Streptomonas
 Tasmanites
 Trichloris

Prasinopapilla is considered to have uncertain taxonomic status. Schilleriomonas is a synonym of Cymbomonas.

References

Chlorophyta
Pyramimonadophyceae